Massachusetts is currently divided into 9 congressional districts, each represented by a member of the United States House of Representatives. After the 2010 census, the number of Massachusetts's seats was decreased from 10 to 9, due to the State's low growth in population since the year 2000. This mandatory redistricting after the 2010 census eliminated Massachusetts's 10th congressional district, and also caused a major shift in how the state's congressional districts are currently drawn.

Current districts and representatives
List of members of the United States House delegation from Massachusetts in the 118th Congress, their terms, their district boundaries, and the district political ratings, according to the CPVI. The delegation has a total of 9 members, all of whom are members of the Democratic party.

Enumeration trends

Before then, the district numeration was not as consistent; sometimes running east to west, other times going counter-clockwise around Boston.

History of apportionment 

Source: U.S. Census Bureau.

Historical and present district boundaries
Table of United States congressional district boundary maps in the State of Massachusetts, presented chronologically. All redistricting events that took place in Massachusetts between 1973 and 2013 are shown.

See also 

 List of United States congressional districts

Notes

References

Further reading

19th century

20th century

21st century

External links 

 Massachusetts Congressional Districts map, 2004